William Easterling is a Professor of Geography and former Dean of the Penn State College of Earth and Mineral Sciences. He is currently the assistant director for the Directorate for Geosciences (GEO) at the National Science Foundation.

Education 
B.A. Geography and History, University of North Carolina-Chapel Hill, 1976

M.A. Economic Geography, University of North Carolina-Chapel Hill, 1980

PhD. Geography-Climatology, University of North Carolina-Chapel Hill, 1984

High School: Christchurch School in Virginia

Awards 
 Fellow American Association for the Advancement of Science
 Wilson Award, Honoring Excellence in Research, April 2003, College of Earth and Mineral Sciences, The Pennsylvania State University.

References 

Pennsylvania State University faculty
Living people
American climatologists
University of North Carolina at Chapel Hill alumni
Year of birth missing (living people)